In this list of boots, a boot type can fit into more than one of the categories, and may therefore be mentioned more than once.

Forms

Styles

Sport boots

Work boots

Equestrian boots

Military boots

High-heeled boots

Brands

Licensed
 Caterpillar
 Harley-Davidson
 Patagonia Footwear
 Xtratuf

Boots
Clothing-related lists